Bucio is a Spanish surname with significant usage in Mexico. Notable people with the surname include:
Arturo Ramírez Bucio (born 1962), Mexican politician
Lauro Bucio (born 1993), Mexican footballer
Maríano Bucio (born 1942), Mexican equestrian
Olivia Bucio (born 1954), Mexican actress

Spanish-language surnames